A pupusa is a thick griddle cake or flatbread from El Salvador and Honduras, made with cornmeal or rice flour, similar to the Colombian and Venezuelan arepa. In El Salvador, it has been declared the national dish and has a specific day to celebrate it. It is usually stuffed with one or more ingredients, which may include cheese (such as quesillo or cheese with loroco buds), chicharrón, squash, or refried beans. It is typically accompanied by curtido (a spicy fermented cabbage slaw) and tomato salsa, and is traditionally eaten by hand.

Etymology 
There is no definite explanation for the origin of the word. It is possible that the word stems from the verb pupusawa which means 'to puff up', but there is no known current or historical use of this word within the communities.

Origin
El Salvador and Honduras both claim to be the birthplace of the pupusa. Salvadoran archeologist Roberto Ordóñez attributed the creation of the pupusa to the Pipil people due to the name meaning 'swollen' in the Pipil language. Honduran etymologists say that since the Pipil language is so close to the Nahuatl language, the Nahuas of Honduras could have created the dish. However, no direct links have been made to the community.

The topic of the pupusa's origin also came up during the negotiation for the CAFTA-DR. Both nations wanted to make the pupusa an exclusive export. After two days, the Honduran delegation ceded the right to El Salvador.

History

Pupusas have been linked to the Pipil tribes who inhabited the territory now known as El Salvador. 

A version of the pre-Columbian pupusa was vegetarian and half-moon shaped. In the late 1940s, pupusas were still not widespread across El Salvador and were mostly localized in the central towns. They were documented previously in Guatemala and Honduras. As the Salvadorian population began migrating to other areas in the 1960s, pupusa stands proliferated across the country. In Guatemala during the 1970s, pupusas had a half-moon shape. Pupusas served east of the Lempa River usually have a much larger diameter.

In the 1980s, the Salvadoran civil war forced a Salvadoran migration to other countries, mainly the United States, which made pupusas available elsewhere: Salvadoran immigrants brought the dish to most areas of the US, and they spread to Canada and Australia as well. By the 1990s, they were common in cities such as Los Angeles, New York, and San Francisco. Pupusas have been popular in Washington, D.C., since the 1980s and in 2019, November 6 was declared the day of the pupusa.

In April 2005, the Salvadoran Legislative Assembly declared pupusas as the national dish of El Salvador and every second Sunday of November would be National Pupusas Day. A fair is typically held on the day in the capital and a few big cities. On 10 November 2007, in celebration of National Pupusa Day, the Secretary of Culture organized a fair in the capital park in which they would make the world's biggest pupusa. It fed 5,000 people. Five years later, the record was broken again with a pupusa  in diameter.

In 2011, The Guardian named pupusas that year's Best Street Food in New York.

Both at home and abroad, pupusas are traditionally served with curtido (a pickled cabbage relish, analogous to German Sauerkraut and Korean kimchi that comes in mild and spicy varieties) and tomato sauce, and are traditionally eaten by hand. Author Carlos Cordova reports an ancient pre-Hispanic belief that it was sinful to cut tortillas with a knife; they must be cut with fingers as corn was believed to be a divine grain. This might be the reason why generation after generation has adhered to the rule of eating pupusas with the hands.

Regional variations
A variant of the pupusa in El Salvador is the pupusa de arroz, originally hailing from the town of Olocuilta in the east of San Salvador. Rice flour is used to make the dough and they are usually stuffed with chopped pork, cheese, beans, zucchini, and other vegetables. Another regional variation, found in Alegría, is the pupusa de banano, which calls for the addition of plantain bananas to the pupusa.

Latin America
Pupusas are also found in neighboring Central American countries. Honduran versions use the local quesillo type of cheese for the filling. In Costa Rica, both "Salvadoran pupusas" and "pupusas" are available, the latter being a local version. There, they are a staple of the food stalls at regional carnivals known as fiestas.

A similar Mexican dish is called a gordita (literally, "little fatty"), but gorditas are usually open at one end. In Colombia and Venezuela, they make arepas. Colombian arepas are usually eaten without filling, or the filling is placed inside the dough before cooking. Venezuela has its own recipe for arepas, but, unlike Colombian arepas, the dough is cooked first, and then sliced in half and stuffed somewhat like a hamburger.

United States
Pupusas made in the United States are typically made with Maseca (brand) commercial corn flour-masa mix, instead of fresh masa. Some high-end pupuserías in the United States use rice flour and wheat flour versions. In Santa Fe, New Mexico, variations include using spinach, pepperoni, cheese, and green chile.

Taco Cabana, a Tex-Mex chain in Texas, created a dish called the pupusa that has no relation to the Salvadoran food.

Gallery

Economic impact
In spite of their low market price, pupusas represent an important element in the economy of El Salvador. Rising ingredient costs in 2022 have led to concerns about rising pupusa prices.

In addition to whole pupusas, the individual ingredients are also exported; in 2005, for example, US$604,408 worth of loroco, sometimes used as a pupusa filling, was sold to the United States alone.
Frozen pupusas can be found in the refrigerated section of many Hispanic and international supermarkets in the United States, especially those located in highly concentrated areas of Salvadorans such as Washington, D.C., and Long Island, New York.

Pupusa sales play a significant role in the Salvadoran economy. According to the Salvadoran Ministry of Economy between the years of 2001–2003, pupuserias generated $22 million. The export of ingredients such as loroco has also helped boost the economy. As of 2005, 300,000 people made pupusas for a living, with a majority of them being women.

See also
 List of maize dishes
 List of street foods

References

Further reading
 Carman, Tim.  "Perfect Pupusas Require a Mastery of Masa". The Washington Post, 2012.
 Lawson, Susan C. "Latin LESSONS". Indianapolis Monthly, vol. 25, no. 10, 2002, pp. 164.
Nickles, Greg. "The Flavors of El Salvador". El Salvador: The People & Culture, 2002, pp. 28–29.

 Scherer, Jane. "Pupusas". Faces, vol. 15, no. 3, November 1998, p. 19.

Maize dishes
National dishes
Salvadoran cuisine
Tortilla-based dishes
Honduran cuisine